Nahar in Iran may refer to:
 Nahar, East Azerbaijan (نهار - Nahār)
 Nahar, Semnan (ناهر - Nāhar)